Golden Valley is a city in Mercer County, North Dakota, United States. The population was 182 at the 2020 census. Golden Valley was founded in 1913.

Geography
Golden Valley is located at (47.291648, -102.067771).

Demographics

2010 census
As of the census of 2010, there were 182 people, 92 households and 54 families residing in the city. The racial makeup of the city was 97.3% White, 1.1% Native American, 1.1% Asian, and 0.5% from two or more races. Hispanic or Latino of any race were 1.6% of the population.

There were 92 households, of which 14.1% had children under the age of 18 living with them, 50.0% were married couples living together, 6.5% had a female householder with no husband present, 2.2% had a male householder with no wife present, and 41.3% were non-families. 38.0% of all households were made up of individuals, and 15.3% had someone living alone who was 65 years of age or older. The average household size was 1.98 and the average family size was 2.57.

The median age in the city was 50.2 years. 17% of residents were under the age of 18; 3.2% were between the ages of 18 and 24; 19.7% were from 25 to 44; 40.6% were from 45 to 64; and 19.2% were 65 years of age or older. The gender makeup of the city was 50.5% male and 49.5% female.

2000 census
As of the census of 2000, there were 183 people, 91 households and 51 families residing in the city.  The population density was 253.2 people per square mile (98.1/km2). There were 124 housing units at an average density of 171.6 per square mile (66.5/km2).  The racial makeup of the city was 99.45% White, and 0.55% from two or more races.

There were 91 households, out of which 18.7% had children under the age of 18 living with them, 46.2% were married couples living together, 9.9% had a female householder with no husband present and 42.9% were non-families. 37.4% of all households were made up of individuals, and 19.8% had someone living alone who was 65 years of age or older.  The average household size was 2.01 and the average family size was 2.63.

In the city, the population was spread out, with 17.5% under the age of 18, 4.9% from 18 to 24, 20.2% from 25 to 44, 31.7% from 45 to 64, and 25.7% who were 65 years of age or older.  The median age was 47 years. For every 100 females, there were 98.9 males.  For every 100 females age 18 and over, there were 104.1 males.

The median income for a household in the city was $27,188, and the median income for a family was $39,688. Males had a median income of $38,125 versus $15,625 for females. The per capita income for the city was $14,783.  Approximately 18.4% of families and 20.7% of the population were below the poverty line, including 35.1% of those under the age of eighteen and 7.8% of those sixty-five or over.

References

Cities in North Dakota
Cities in Mercer County, North Dakota
Populated places established in 1913
1913 establishments in North Dakota